Poland women's national floorball team is the national team of Poland in women's floorball.  At the 2001 Floorball Women's World Championship in Riga, Latvia, the team finished fourth in the B-Division. At the 2003 Floorball Women's World Championship in Germany, the team finished second in the B-Division. At the 2007 Floorball Women's World Championship in Frederikshavn, Denmark, the team finished first in the B-Division.

References 

Women's national floorball teams
Floorball